Tokozile Xasa (born 28 April 1965) is a South African politician, replaced as Minister of Tourism of South Africa by President Cyril Ramaphosa in his cabinet re-shuffle on 26 February 2018.  Under Xasa's watch SA Tourism, an entity under the Department of Tourism, spent R6.9 million on the PR services of Bell Pottinger, at the same time the controversial Gupta Family were using Bell Pottinger to sow racial division in South Africa. Xasa was the Minister of Sport and Recreation from 26 February 2018 to 29 May 2019.

Education
Xasa holds a bachelor's degree from the University of Transkei as well as a master's degree in Public Administration from the University of Fort Hare.

Political career
Prior to her appointment as minister, Xasa served as mayor of a district municipality in the Kei District Council in the Eastern Cape during the transitional period in 1997, an office she held until 2000. Between 2005 and 2009 she was a member of the Provincial Executive Council of Social Development in the Eastern Cape.

On 31 March 2017 she replaced Derek Hanekom as the Minister of Tourism.

References

External links
Tokozile Xasa Who's Who Southern Africa

1965 births
Living people
African National Congress politicians
Government ministers of South Africa
Members of the National Assembly of South Africa
Women government ministers of South Africa
University of Fort Hare alumni
Women members of the National Assembly of South Africa
South African Ministers for Sport and Recreation
Members of the Eastern Cape Provincial Legislature